Coast Guard Atlantic Area (LANTAREA) is an area command of United States Coast Guard that oversees all Coast Guard domestic operations east of the Rocky Mountains, including the Caribbean and foreign areas of interest in Europe, Africa, and Southeast Asia.

Under LANTAREA are the First, Fifth, Seventh and Ninth Coast Guard Districts.

LANTAREA collaborates with the Coast Guard Pacific Area to respond to national level incidents, including hurricane response and large-scale environmental pollution. They deploy cutters to areas within their control to combat transnational organized crime, to prevent, deter, detect and interdict illicit smuggling efforts.

References

 

Atlantic Area
Military units and formations in Virginia
Portsmouth, Virginia